Sujata Mehta is a former Indian Foreign Service officer, currently serving as a member of the Union Public Service Commission.

Personal life
Sujata Singh was born on 30 March 1957. She holds a Master of Philosophy in Political Science and joined the Indian Foreign Service in 1980.

Career
An Indian Foreign Service officer of the 1980 cadre, Mehta served as the Third Secretary at the Embassy of India in Moscow from August 1982 to February 1984. She has also served at Indian missions in Dhaka, India's permanent mission at the United Nations and as the Indian Ambassador to Spain. She was also deputed at the United Nations. Sujata Mehta served as  Ambassador and Permanent Representative of India to the United Nations Conference on Disarmament, Geneva. She also served in various capacities at the Ministry of External Affairs and the Prime Minister's Office.

Sujata Mehta was appointed as a member of the Union Public Service Commission about a month prior to her superannuation. She left the Indian Foreign Service and was sworn in on 21 February 2017.

References

External links
Appointment to UPSC "Air Marshal Ajit Shankarrao Bhonsle and Ms. Sujata Mehta take oath as Members, UPSC", Business Standard 
List of UPSC Board Members "UPSC Board"
Profile from ministry website "Sujata Mehta"

Indian Foreign Service officers
Living people
Ambassadors of India to Spain
Year of birth missing (living people)
Indian women ambassadors
Members of Union Public Service Commission